Calling All Girls is Hilly Michaels' solo debut, and was released on Warner Bros. Records in 1980.

Track listing
All tracks composed by Hilly Michaels and Kip Saginor except as indicated

Personnel
Hilly Michaels - lead vocals, guitar, drums, percussion
Dan Hartman - bass, guitar, keyboards, autoharp, backing vocals
Davey Johnstone - guitar
Jimmy McAllister -  guitar
Billy Cross - guitar
Morgan Walker, Tom Mandel - keyboards
Greg Hawkes - synthesizer
George Young - saxophone
Ellen Bernfeld, Ellen Foley, Joe Mauri, Karla DeVito, Liza Minnelli, Lorna Luft, Patrick Linfer-Lau - backing vocals

Performance
Despite strong reviews  and a video for "Calling All Girls" that got heavy play on MTV, neither the single nor the album cracked the Billboard charts. (The "Calling All Girls" single did manage to scrape onto the Record World chart at #109.) The second single, "Shake It and Dance" also faltered, but today the LP is considered by some to be a new-wave classic.

References

1980 debut albums
Albums produced by Roy Thomas Baker
Warner Records albums